was a six-member Japanese boy band formed by Johnny & Associates. The group debuted on November 1, 1995, with the single "Music for the People", which was used as the image song for the World Cup of Volleyball in 1995. Their first four singles, including "Music for the People", were all cover versions of the same-titled Eurobeat songs composed by Italian producers such as Giancarlo Pasquini, Andrea Leonardi, Alberto Contini, Sandro Oliva.

Similar to their agency seniors Hikaru Genji, the group is separated into two subgroups based on age. For V6, the group is split into 20th Century and Coming Century, which consists of the three oldest members and three youngest members respectively. The band sold more than 13.5 million albums and singles.

As announced on March 12, 2021, V6 disbanded on November 1, 2021, their 26th anniversary since debut.

History

Name
In an interview on Hey! Hey! Hey! Music Champ, the group stated that the "V" in V6 also stood for "Versus" (20th Century versus Coming Century) at first. However, then-president Johnny Kitagawa informed the group that the "V" had multiple meanings, such as "Volleyball", "Vegetable" (as Sakamoto's parents own a green grocers), "Bicycle" ("V" and "B" are indistinguishable in Japanese; Nagano's parents own a cycling store) and "Veteran".

1995–2021
From 1997 to 2008, V6 hosted their own variety show  and is hosting Viva Viva V6 since 2001 on Fuji TV. Along with their group shows, the members also have individual TV shows, dramas or radio programs.

V6 celebrated their tenth anniversary in 2005, commemorating the event by holding about thirty concerts in sold-out arenas all over Japan, holding 3 major "Thank You Events", releasing the movie Hold Up Down and releasing Musicmind as their new album.  They also had a rare "Handshake Session" with hundreds of thousands of fans in Tokyo, Nagoya, Osaka and Fukuoka.

As separate bands, both of them performed the opening song for the anime, Eyeshield 21. Coming Century performed "Breakthrough", the first opening theme song and 20th Century performed "Innocence", the second opening theme song. As V6, they performed "Chain of Power" as an insert song. They also sang "Change the World" and "Brand New World", the first opening and eighth ending themes, respectively of the popular anime InuYasha, as well as "Break Out", the 18th opening song of popular anime Fairy Tail. They later performed the 21st opening song of One Piece, "Super Powers".

On May 3, 2017, they released the double A-side single titled "COLORS/Taiyou to Tsuki no Kodomotachi". The title track "COLORS" will be used as the theme song for member Yoshihiko Inohara's starring drama "Keishicho Sousa Ikka 9 Gakari season12" on TV Asahi. Meanwhile, "Taiyou to Tsuki no Kodomotachi" has been picked up for NHK's "Minna no Uta" for April and May.

On March 12, 2021, Johnny & Associates announced V6 will disband on November 1, which is V6's 26th anniversary since debuting. In July, they announced that they will host their last concert tour LIVE TOUR V6 groove from September 4 to November 1, the first day and the last day of the live tour, which is the date of V6 formation and their debut date. Also, they will release their new album STEP on September 4.

On October 26, 2021, V6 hosted their last TV variety show  as a group. They also released their last best album Very6 BEST.

Members

20th Century
  — (leader of V6 and 20th Century)

Coming Century
   — (leader of Coming Century)

Discography

Studio albums
 Since 1995: Forever (1996)
 Nature Rhythm (1997)
 A Jack in the Box (1998)
 "Lucky" 20th Century, Coming Century to Be Continued... (1999)
 "Happy" Coming Century, 20th Century Forever (2000)
 Volume 6 (2001)
 Seven (2002)
 Infinity: Love & Life (2003)
 Musicmind (2005)
 Voyager (2007)
 Ready? (2010)
 Oh! My! Goodness! (2013)
 The Ones (2017)
 Step (2021)

Compilation albums
 Very Best (2001)
 Very Best II (2006)
 Super Very Best (2015)
 Very6 Best (2021)

Videography

DVD/VHS

1996: Live for the People
1997: Film V6: Clips and More
1998: Space (from V6 Live Tour '98)
1999: Film V6 Cct II: Clips and More
2001: Very Happy!!!
2002: Film V6 Act III: Clips and More
2002: Liv6
2003: Hard Luck Hero (movie)
2004: Love & Life (V6 Summer Special Dream Live 2003)
2005: Film V6 Act IV (Ballad Clips and More)
2005: Film V6 act IV (Dance Clips and More)
2005: Very Best Live (1995—2004)
2005: Hold Up Down (movie)
2006: 10th Anniversary Concert Tour 2005: Musicmind
2008: V6 Live Tour 2007 Voyager (Boku to Bokura no Ashita)
2009: V6 Live Tour 2008 Vibes
2010: V6 Live DVD Asia Tour 2010 in Japan Ready?
2012: V6 Live Tour 2011 Sexy.Honey.Bunny!
2013: V6 Live Tour 2013 Oh! My! Goodness!
2016: V6 Live Tour 2015 -since 1995~forever-
2018: LIVE TOUR 2017 The ONES
2021: For the 25th anniversary
2022: LIVE TOUR V6 groove

20th Century
2009: 20th Century Live Tour 2008 Ore Ja Nakya, Kimi Ja Nakya
2009: 20th Century Live Tour 2009 Honey Honey Honey

Coming Century
1997: Sky
1998: Question
2003: Cosmic Rescue (movie)
2009: We are Coming Century Boys Live Tour 2009

Other activities
As a group, the members of V6 have done dramas such as V no Honoo in 1995 and movies such as Hard Luck Hero in 2003 and Hold Up Down in 2005.

Films

V6
  (2003)
  (2004) (Japanese Dub)
  (2005)

Coming Century
 COSMIC RESCUE (2003)

Drama
  (1995, Fuji TV) - all members of V6
 PU-PU-PU- (1998, TBS) - members of Kamisen
  (1999, NTV) - members of Kamisen
  (Fuji TV) - members of Tonisen

Variety Shows
  (1996-1999, NTV)
  (1997 - 2005, TBS)
  (2005 - 2008, TBS)
  (Nov 13, 2015, TBS)
  (Aug 30, 2017, TBS)
  (Sep 24, 2018, TBS)
  (Sep 23, 2019, TBS)
  (Nov 3, 2020, TBS)
  (Oct 26, 2021, TBS)
  (NTV, 1998, 2000)
  (1999 - 2000, Fuji TV)
  (2000, Fuji TV)
  (2000 - 2001, Fuji TV)
  (2001, TBS) - Kamisen
  (2001 - 2002, TBS) - Kamisen
  (2002, TBS) - Kamisen
  (2002 - 2004, TBS)
  (2006 - 2007, TBS) - Tonisen
 "VivaVivaV6" (2001 - 2010, Fuji TV)
  (2008 - 2010, TBS)
  (2010 - 2011, TBS)
  (Oct 2011 - Oct 2012, TBS)
  (Oct 2012 - Mar 2014, TBS)
  (Apr 2013 - 2 Episodes Aired only  TBS)
  (Apr 2014 - Oct 2021, TBS)

References

External links
Official site on Avex Trax
Official site on Johnny's net
Official 26th Anniversary Special site on Avex Trax

Avex Group artists
Japanese pop music groups
Japanese rock music groups
Japanese idol groups
Japanese boy bands
Johnny & Associates
Musical groups established in 1995
Musical groups from Tokyo
Musical groups disestablished in 2021